Alan Ford (born 23 February 1938) is an English actor. He is best known for his roles in Guy Ritchie gangster movies Snatch and Lock, Stock and Two Smoking Barrels, and from appearing as separate characters in eight different episodes of The Bill.

Early life
Ford was born on 23 February 1938 in Camberwell, South London, the eldest son of a seamstress and a taxi driver, and grew up in Elephant and Castle. He left school at the age of 15 and took on various jobs, ending with two years of national service in the Royal Army Ordnance Corps.

Studies and training
François Truffaut cast Ford as one of the firemen in his Fahrenheit 451. Next, Ford secured a place at East 15 Acting School. For three years he studied drama in all its forms: Shakespeare, Chekhov, restoration, commedia dell'arte, pantomime, music, dance, fencing, Stanislavski and improvisation. One of his tutors there at that time was the then unknown Mike Leigh.

Acting career
Ford has appeared on stage at the National Theatre, Royal Court Theatre, the Theatre Royal Stratford East and many repertory theatres.

Ford appeared in Exorcist: The Beginning and, much earlier, as Roosta in the original radio version of The Hitchhiker's Guide to the Galaxy, along with a small speaking role in The Long Good Friday.

Ford played Clifford Harding in G.F. Newman's Law & Order in 1978, then had a brief role in the film An American Werewolf in London, where he plays the taxi driver who says the line, "It puts you in mind of the days of the old demon barber of Fleet Street, doesn't it?" in response to the recent wave of murders around London. He has also proven himself a comic actor. He was involved in the Armando Iannucci production Knowing Me, Knowing You with Alan Partridge, playing a boxing promoter called Terry Norton; and he worked again with Iannucci playing the 'East End Thug' in The Armando Iannucci Shows. He later appeared as a priest in every episode of Snuff Box. In 2015, he played former Thotch band manager 'Big' Basil Steel in Brian Pern: 45 Years of Prog & Roll.

In 1998, Ford narrated and appeared in the Guy Ritchie directed crime comedy Lock, Stock and Two Smoking Barrels, and, in 2000, he appeared as the crime boss 'Brick Top' in Ritchie's film Snatch.

In 2003, Ford provided the voice of Goliath in the British version of JoJo's Circus. 

Ford was featured in the 2010 music video "For He's a Jolly Good Felon" by The Lostprophets.

In 2011 he starred as crime boss 'Carter' in the film noir Jack Falls alongside his Lock, Stock co-stars Jason Flemyng and Dexter Fletcher, while in 2014, he was cast in the crime thriller Two Days in the Smoke alongside fellow Lock, Stock actor Stephen Marcus.

In 2013 Ford had a guest role in the Norwegian-American TV show Lilyhammer as crime family boss 'Uncle Terry'.

In 2018, Ford appeared in a primary supporting role as Dale Jacobs in the psychological thriller Winter Ridge.

Writer
In 2006, Ford published his novel Thin Ice. He said the book "evolved from a collection of anecdotes and actors’ tales."

In music
Ford's voice is featured in the dubstep song "Cockney Thug" by Rusko, "Well 'Ard" by Caspa and The Others, "Crunch" by Flux Pavilion and Datsik, "Damien" by Modestep & Funtcase, the death metal song "A Child Is Missing" from the Illdisposed album The Prestige and the hip-hop song "Sinister" by Aesop Rock, Vast Aire and Yeshua from the 2001 Centrifugal Phorce compilation Euphony.

Personal life
Ford is married and a father, and lives in Primrose Hill, North London. He has been a vegetarian since 1973.

Filmography

Films

Television

References

External links

1938 births
Living people
20th-century English male actors
21st-century English male actors
Alumni of East 15 Acting School
English male film actors
English male soap opera actors
Male actors from London
People from Camberwell
People from Elephant and Castle
Royal Army Ordnance Corps soldiers
Military personnel from London